Jedediah Berry (born 1977) is an American writer. He is the author of a novel, The Manual of Detection (2009).

Background and education
Berry was born in Randolph, Vermont, and spent his childhood in Catskill, New York. He attended Bard College, and earned a graduate degree from the MFA Program for Poets & Writers at the University of Massachusetts Amherst. He has worked as an editor at Small Beer Press.

Work
Berry’s first novel, The Manual of Detection, was published by The Penguin Press in 2009. It won the 2009 Hammett Prize and the 2010 Crawford Award. Set in an unnamed city, the novel follows file clerk Charles Unwin as he attempts to solve a mystery involving a missing detective and a criminal mastermind operating through people’s dreams. Critics have noted that The Manual of Detection combines elements from several genres of fiction, including mystery and fantasy. Writing for The Guardian, Michael Moorcock situated the book within the tradition of steampunk fiction. The New Yorker called it “the kind of mannered fantasy that might result if Wes Anderson were to adapt Kafka.” A reviewer for The Observer compared it to The Third Policeman by Flann O'Brien, and described it as “imaginative, fantastical, sometimes inexplicable, labyrinthine and ingenious.”
An abridged version of the novel, read by Toby Jones, was broadcast on BBC Radio 4 Extra in January 2013.

Berry’s short stories have appeared in Conjunctions, Chicago Review, Ninth Letter, and other magazines. He has taught at the MFA Program for Poets & Writers at the University of Massachusetts Amherst, and he currently teaches at Bard College.

Notes

External links
 Jedediah Berry's Website
 Interview at Bookslut

21st-century American novelists
American fantasy writers
1977 births
Living people
Bard College alumni
University of Massachusetts Amherst MFA Program for Poets & Writers alumni
American male novelists
American male short story writers
21st-century American short story writers
People from Catskill, New York
21st-century American male writers
Novelists from New York (state)